"The Cruel Mother" (a.k.a. "The Greenwood Side" or "Greenwood Sidey") is a murder ballad originating in England that has since become popular throughout the wider English-speaking world.

According to Roud and Bishop

Widely collected in Britain and Ireland, and in North America, 'The Cruel Mother' has clearly struck a chord with singers over a number of generations. We will never know quite why, of course, but in performance the combination of the matter-of-fact handling of a difficult subject and the repeated rhythmic refrain often creates a stark and hypnotic tale, which is extremely effective.

Synopsis
A woman gives birth to one or two illegitimate children (usually sons) in the woods, kills them, and buries them.  On her return trip home, she sees a child, or children, playing, and says that if they were hers, she would dress them in various fine garments and otherwise take care of them.  The children tell her that when they were hers, she would not dress them so but murdered them.  Frequently they say she will be damned for it.

Some variants open with the account that she has fallen in love with her father's clerk.

Variants
This ballad exists in a number of variants, in some of which there are verses where the dead children tell the mother she will suffer a number of penances each lasting seven years, e.g. "Seven years to ring a bell / And seven years porter in hell". Those verses properly belong in "The Maid and the Palmer" (Child ballad 21).  Variants of "The Cruel Mother" include "Carlisle Hall", "The Rose o Malinde", "Fine Flowers in the Valley", "The Minister's Daughter of New York", and "The Lady From Lee", among others. "Fine Flowers of the Valley" is a Scottish variant. Weela Weela Walya is an Irish schoolyard version.  A closely related German ballad exists in many variants: a child comes to a woman's wedding to announce himself her child and that she had murdered three children, the woman says the Devil can carry her off if it is true, and the Devil appears to do so.

Ballad scholar Hyder Rollins listed a broadside print dated 1638, and a fairly complete version was published in London in broadside ballad format as "The Duke's Daughter's Cruelty: Or the Wonderful Apparition of two Infants whom she Murther'd and Buried in a Forrest, for to hide her Shame" sometime between 1684 and 1695.

This ballad was one of 25 traditional works included in Ballads Weird and Wonderful (1912) and illustrated by Vernon Hill.

Recordings

See also
List of the Child Ballads
Down by the Greenwood Side (opera)

References

External links
The Cruel Mother
The Cruel Mother with historical commentary
Fine Flowers in the Valley variant

Songwriter unknown
Murder ballads
Child Ballads
Filicide in fiction
Joan Baez songs
Year of song unknown